is the second  season of the JoJo's Bizarre Adventure anime by David Production, based on the JoJo's Bizarre Adventure manga series by Hirohiko Araki. It is the second animated adaptation of the manga's third part, Stardust Crusaders, following an original video animation series by A.P.P.P. that was released first in 1993 and continued later in 2000.

This "Part" of the series is one of the most popular "Parts" of JoJo's Bizarre Adventure. The series aired for 48 episodes, split into two parts consisting of 24 episodes each. The first part aired on Tokyo MX between April 5, and September 13, 2014, also syndicated on MBS, Animax, and other channels. The second part, subtitled , aired between January 10, and June 20, 2015. The series was simulcast outside of Asia on Crunchyroll's streaming services. A preview of the English language dub of the first three episodes was streamed on Crunchyroll on July 5, 2014, tying in with its premiere at Anime Expo 2014. The English dub began airing in North America on Adult Swim's Toonami programming block from July 30, 2017. Viz Media released a Blu-ray set of the first 24 episodes, that includes English and Japanese audio with subtitles for the Japanese, in North America on July 3, 2018, with the remaining 24 episodes being released in a subsequent set on January 22, 2019.

Plot 
In 1983, Dio, the vampiric enemy of Jonathan Joestar, emerges from the bottom of the Atlantic Ocean after stealing Jonathan's body. Dio develops a manifestation of life energy known as a Stand, causing Jonathan's descendants Joseph Joestar, Holly Kujo, and Jotaro Kujo to also gain Stands in 1988. Holly, lacking the strength to control her Stand, falls ill and is estimated to have fifty days left to live. Jotaro, Joseph, and fellow Stand users Muhammad Avdol and Noriyaki Kakyoin travel from Japan to Egypt to find and kill Dio, which will free Holly from her Stand-induced illness. The group is later joined by Jean Pierre Polnareff, a former assassin of Dio's who seeks revenge on his sister's killer, and a Stand user dog named Iggy. Aided by Kakyoin, who reveals the nature of Dio's time-stopping Stand The World in his last moments, Jotaro kills Dio in Egypt, allowing Holly to recover.

Voice cast

Production 
Although teased at in the post-credit scenes of the first season's finale, the second season of the JoJo anime was officially announced in October 2013 in the November 2013 issue of Ultra Jump and the fifth tankōbon volume of JoJolion. David Production revealed that as with the different art styles they used for the first season, which covered the Phantom Blood and Battle Tendency arcs, they would be attempting a new art style with the Stardust Crusaders season. Takehito Koyasu reprises his role as Dio from the previous season and Daisuke Ono reprises his role as Jotaro Kujo from the JoJo's Bizarre Adventure: All Star Battle video game, but all other characters were given new voice actors.

Music 
The opening theme for the first half of the season is "Stand Proud", performed by Jin Hashimoto, while the ending theme is American female pop rock band The Bangles' 1986 single "Walk Like an Egyptian". This song was used again in episodes 36 and 37, this time performed by Hidenobu Kiuchi with Motoko Kumai, as the characters Hol Horse and Boingo; a digital single was released for this version of the song as well. The original score for the series is composed by Yugo Kanno. The first soundtrack album Departure was released on July 30, 2014, and a second soundtrack album Journey was included with the second volume of the Blu-ray releases, released on August 27, 2014. A third soundtrack album titled World was included with the first volume of the "Battle in Egypt" Blu-ray releases, released on April 22, 2015. A fourth album titled Destination was then released as an individual CD on May 27, 2015, and included a full-length version of "Aku-yaku Kyōsōkyoku".

Episode list

Stardust Crusaders (2014)

Stardust Crusaders: Battle in Egypt (2015)

See also 
JoJo's Bizarre Adventure – an original video animation adaptation of Part 3: Stardust Crusaders by Studio APPP

Notes

References

External links 
 Official website 
 

JoJo's Bizarre Adventure (Season 2)
2014 Japanese television seasons
2015 Japanese television seasons
Television series set in 1987
Television shows set in Egypt
Split television seasons